"The Raider of the Copper Hill" or "The King of the Copper Hill" is a 1993 Scrooge McDuck comic by Don Rosa. It is the fourth of the original 12 chapters in the series The Life and Times of Scrooge McDuck. The story takes place from 1884 to 1885.

The story was first published in the Danish Anders And & Co. #1993-02; the first American publication was in Uncle Scrooge #288, in October 1994.

Storyline
The competition in the cattle business in the Montana Territory is growing bigger, and less profitable. Sixteen-seventeen year old teenager Scrooge McDuck's employer, Murdo MacKenzie decides to quit, and therefore has to let Scrooge go. Scrooge is not sad, but decides to try his luck as a silver prospector. There is no luck in it, but he does find some copper. Eating dinner in town at night with Marcus Daly, owner of the shut down Anaconda Silver Mine which has found tonnes of copper, he does find out that the government is putting up electric wire, made of copper, making the price skyrocket.

Thus he again starts prospecting, but doesn't know how to dig the best way, until Howard Rockerduck gives him some help. They find a small copper vein, that is the same as that off the Anaconda Mine, which is making a lot of money. Rockerduck does know of the Apex law and due to this, Scrooge becomes the owner of the Anaconda Mine. He is however forced to sell it back to Marcus Daly for ten thousand dollars, as he receives a telegram from his father, asking him to come home, since there is a "terrible crisis for the Clan McDuck" going on.

Scrooge leaves for Scotland after five years in America, and as the ship sets sail from New York City he thinks to himself that a statue should be placed there, to welcome people seeking a chance to succeed on their own terms. Behind him - where he can't see it - the Statue of Liberty is under construction.

External links

Raider of the Copper Hill on Duckman
The Life and Times of $crooge McDuck - Episode 4

Fiction set in 1884
Fiction set in 1885
1993 in comics
Donald Duck comics by Don Rosa
Comics set in the 19th century
Comics set in Montana
Comics set in New York City
Disney comics stories
The Life and Times of Scrooge McDuck